Mertensophryne micranotis is a species of toad in the family Bufonidae. It is found in southeastern Kenya and eastern Tanzania, including Zanzibar and Songo Songo Island.
Its natural habitats are lowland forests, dense woodlands, thickets, and the forest-miombo woodland boundaries. It is regularly seen but difficult to detect. It is probably affected by habitat loss caused by agriculture, wood extraction and human settlement.

References

micranotis
Frogs of Africa
Amphibians of Kenya
Amphibians of Tanzania
Taxa named by Arthur Loveridge
Amphibians described in 1925
Taxonomy articles created by Polbot